Gymnothorax pseudotile is a species of fish found in West Bengal, India. It has big eyes, a dull snout, and an elongated body. They have 126–129 vertebrae.

References 

pseudotile
Fish described in 2017